Swamiji, swami-ji, or swami ji is a variant of swami that is used as a direct form of address toward, or as a stand-in for the name of, a Hindu religious leader (and usually capitalized in such usage).

It may more specifically refer to:

Pramukh Swami Maharaj (1921-2016), 5th Spiritual successor of Bhagwan Swaminarayan
Mahant Swami Maharaj (1933-Present), 6th Spiritual successor of Bhagwan Swaminarayan and present leader of the BAPS Swaminarayan Sanstha
Swamiji Vivekananda (1863–1902), chief disciple of Ramakrishna, one of the makers of modern India
Swamiji (film), a 2012 English-language documentary film about Vivekananda, directed by Manick Sorcar.
Swamijis of the Ashta Mathas of Udupi, a group of eight Hindu monasteries
Swamiji Ram Charan (1720–1799), founder of the Ramsnehi Sampradaya (Ramdwara) religious tradition, an offshoot of Hinduism
Swamiji Ram Kishor (1918–1994), 13th head of the Ramsnehi Sampradaya